Villa Loretto is a historic institutional building located at Peekskill, Westchester County, New York. It was built in 1928 by the Sisters of the Good Shepherd for the housing and treatment of young delinquent women.  It is a three to four story, "H" shaped brick building containing more than 175,000 square feet. The facility closed in June 1975.  It has been converted to condominium residences known as Villa at the Woods.

The property was added to the National Register of Historic Places in 1989.

References

Residential buildings on the National Register of Historic Places in New York (state)
Residential buildings completed in 1928
Houses in Westchester County, New York
Buildings and structures in Peekskill, New York
National Register of Historic Places in Westchester County, New York